Sangarabad (also Romanized as Sangarābād; also known as Sangar Āb) is a village in Dikleh Rural District, Hurand District, Ahar County, East Azerbaijan Province, Iran. At the 2006 census, its population was 89, in 17 families.

References 

Populated places in Ahar County